Thomas Brownhill (10 October 1838 – 6 January 1915) was an English first-class cricketer, who played fourteen matches for Sheffield and Yorkshire from 1862 to 1871.

Born in Ecclesfield, Sheffield, Yorkshire, England, Brownhill was a right-handed batsman, who scored 202 runs at 9.18 with a best of 25 against Surrey, against whom he played half his games.

He died, aged 76, in Wortley, West Yorkshire.

References

1838 births
1915 deaths
English cricketers
Yorkshire cricketers
Cricketers from Sheffield
English cricketers of 1826 to 1863
English cricketers of 1864 to 1889